Raymond Evenor Lawler  (born 23 May 1921) is an Australian actor, dramatist, and theatre producer and director. His most notable play was his tenth, Summer of the Seventeenth Doll (1953), which had its premiere in Melbourne in 1955. The play changed the direction of Australian drama. The story of The Doll is preceded by Kid Stakes, set in 1937, when the characters of The Doll are young adults, and then Other Times, which is set in 1945 and includes most of the same characters.

Early life 
Lawler was born in the Melbourne suburb of Footscray on 23 May 1921, second of eight children of a council worker. He left school at 13 to work in a factory and attended evening acting classes. He wrote his first play at 19, and his play Hal's Belles had good notices in early 1946. It was described as "...easy to stage and is a slick, finished work", then being offered by J. and N. Tait in London and New York.

Career 
He first attracted attention as a writer in 1952 when his play Cradle of Thunder was presented by the National Theatre Competition. In 1955, Summer of the Seventeenth Doll gained first prize in the Playwright Advisory Board Competition with Oriel Gray’s The Torrents and was subsequently presented by the Union Theatre. Lawler played the role of Barney at the premiere of Summer of the Seventeenth Doll in 1955. The play was taken up by the Australian Elizabethan Theatre Trust and presented in all Australian states as well as London and New York. It won the Evening Standard Award for the best new play on the London stage in 1957. Since then it has been translated into many languages and performed in many countries.

Lawler went to London with the cast and lived in Denmark, England, and then in Ireland. Summer of the Seventeenth Doll was followed by The Piccadilly Bushman (1959), presented in Australia by J. C. Williamson’s and published by Angus & Robertson (1961); The Unshaven Cheek, presented at the 1963 Edinburgh International Festival; and A Breach in the Wall, about St Thomas Becket (televised in 1967, produced at Canterbury in 1970).

In 1969, he adapted and dramatised the short story "Before the Party" by Somerset Maugham, for a television series, which was produced by Verity Lambert. A second 13-part series was aired in 1970.

In 1972, he visited Australia for the Melbourne Theatre Company’s production of The Man Who Shot the Albatross, a version of the Governor Bligh story.

In 1975, Lawler returned to settle in Australia as associate director of the Melbourne Theatre Company, with an agreement to complete a trilogy based on Summer of the Seventeenth Doll. The first play, Kid Stakes, opened in December 1975 and the second, Other Times, in December 1976. The Doll Trilogy had its first full performance at the Russell Street Theatre, Melbourne, on 12 February 1977.

Personal life 
Lawler married actress Jacklyn Kelleher in 1956. They had twin sons, Adam and Martin, born in London in May 1957, and subsequently a daughter, Kylie. He turned 100 in May 2021.

Honours and legacy 
Lawler was named an Officer of the Order of the British Empire (OBE) in 1980. The smaller theatre space, the Lawler, in the Melbourne Theatre Company's Southbank Theatre is named after him.

Works

Stage 
 Cradle of Thunder (1949)
 The Bluff and the Fair (1952 – a reworked version of Hal's Belles, 1945)
 The Adventures of Ginger Meggs (1952, children's musical)
 Tram Stop 10! (1954, co-writer of revue)
 Summer of the Seventeenth Doll (1955)
 Return Fare (1955, co-writer of revue)
 The Piccadilly Bushman (1959)
 The Unshaven Cheek (1963)
 A Breach in the Wall (1970)
 The Man Who Shot the Albatross (1971)
 Kid Stakes (1975)
 Other Times (1976)
 Godsend (1982)

References

External links 

1921 births
Living people
20th-century Australian dramatists and playwrights
20th-century Australian male writers
Australian centenarians
Australian male dramatists and playwrights
Australian male stage actors
Australian male writers
Australian Officers of the Order of the British Empire
Male actors from Melbourne
Men centenarians
Writers from Melbourne
People from Footscray, Victoria